The Thief of Baghdad is a 1978 fantasy film directed by Clive Donner and starring Roddy MacDowall and Kabir Bedi. A British and French co-production, the film was released theatrically, except for the United States where it debuted on television.

Plot
Soon after the death of his father, Prince Taj of Sakkar is persuaded to compete for the hand of Princess Yasmine of Baghdad. He is ambushed by agents of his own Wazir, Jaudur. His royal seal is stolen and an innocent man is murdered in his place. Arriving in Baghdad, dressed in rags and hungry, he befriends Hassan, magician and thief.

Stealing suitable robes, Taj and Hassan present themselves to the Caliph, where Taj makes an immediate impression on Yasmine. Wazir Jaudur arrives on a flying carpet to join the suitors. Jaudur, bearing Taj's royal seal, claims to be king following the alleged murder of Prince Taj; he accuses Taj of being an impostor. Taj challenges Jaudur to a duel, but he loses. Jaudur is protected from injury because his soul is hidden at a secret location, making him immortal.

The Caliph, wanting to believe Taj but bound by custom, is forced to accept Jaudur's claim. Perizidah reminds him of a prophecy given at Yasmine's birth that her wedding would bring great wealth. Using this as an excuse to stall for time, the Caliph sends all the suitors on a quest "to find that object in all the world that has the most value", and return in three moons.

Hassan, convinced of Taj's sincerity because of Jaudur's repeated murder attempts, joins him on the quest. Perizidah, acting on Yasmine's behalf (and attracted to Hassan) guides them to a place where they can overhear Jaudur force information from traveling holy man Abu Bakare. They learn of the existence of an all-seeing eye that will help Taj defeat Jaudur.

They steal Jaudur's flying carpet, but when Taj commands, "Take me to where my heart would go," the carpet doesn't leave Yasmine's side. Hassan commands, "Carpet, take us where I would go." The carpet takes them to the temple of the all-seeing eye.

At the temple, the gatekeeper warns that Taj must not allow anything to lure him from the path or he will be turned to stone. Taj sustains insults about his parentage, and resists rescuing a man being devoured by a serpent. He nearly succumbs to a fire trap, but sees a statue of someone who failed before.

Within sight of the temple, Taj is lured away by an image of Yasmine and is turned to stone.

Hassan reluctantly follows Taj with the gatekeeper's blessing: "May your knowledge of deception lead you straight as an arrow to the truth." Hassan resists the insulting chants with more humour than Taj, and his fear prevents him from intervening with the serpent illusion. He is nearly turned aside by chests of treasure, but the sight of the statue of Taj refocuses him.

At the temple, he finds the eye is out of reach. The inscription at his feet, "The truth lies within thy reach," causes him to realize that the eye only appears out of reach and is actually in his grasp. Taj is restored. He uses the eye to learn Yasmine's desire. They attempt to return to Baghdad by flying carpet, but are attacked by Jaudur's men on flying horses. The carpet is slashed to pieces. Taj and Hassan fall in different directions.

Jaudur returns with the eye to Baghdad. Other suitors return with other fabulous gifts, but Jaudur exposes the other gifts as fakes. When presented with the eye, Yasmine uses it to locate Taj and learns that he is lost in the desert.

Taj discovers a bottle in the sand. Opening it releases a giant genie who tries to kill him. Taj tricks the genie back into the bottle. The genie offers Taj three wishes if released. Taj asks to be reunited with Hassan, who is resting in an oasis with beautiful harem girls.

Next he asks the genie to take them to the place where the soul of Jaudur lies. It is in an egg in a bird's nest on the side of a mountain. After Taj collects the soul, the genie takes them back to Baghdad. Jaudur has hypnotized Yasmine and the Caliph into agreeing to the wedding, but Taj arrives in time to prevent it.

Cast
 Roddy McDowall as Hassan
 Kabir Bedi as Prince Taj
 Frank Finlay as Abu Bakare
 Marina Vlady as Perizadah
 Pavla Ustinov as Princess Yasmine
 Daniel Emilfork as Genie
 Ian Holm as The Gatekeeper
 Terence Stamp as Wazir Jaudur
 Peter Ustinov as The Caliph
 Marina Sirtis as Harem Girl (uncredited)

Reception
"An enchanting gem. The fantasy's quality of wonderment and simple moral have been preserved to enchant yet another generation of youngsters. You don't have to be a kid to enjoy it." Kevin Thomas, Los Angeles Times.

"It's a faltering hand stoking the high camp fire here. Behind the ornate theatricality and sumptuous effects of this remake there lurks a total lack of conviction. Hyperactive McDowall (the thief) is upstaged by old pro Ustinov as the Caliph; Kabir Bedi, once India's 'highest paid male model', is a joke as the prince, meant to symbolise the alliance of magic and muscle; and Terence Stamp, as a lethargic representative of Supreme Evil, simply waits around for henchmen or flying carpets to do the dirty work."

References

External links

 The Thief of Baghdad (1978 film) at Horrorcultfilms.co.UK
 
 

1978 films
British fantasy adventure films
1970s English-language films
1970s fantasy adventure films
Films set in Baghdad
Fictional caliphs
Films based on The Thief of Bagdad
Genies in film
Works based on Aladdin
British remakes of American films
Films shot in Almería
Films directed by Clive Donner
1970s British films